Bitchin' Bajas  is a band operated as a side-project by Cooper Crain, who is also guitarist/organist of the band Cave. The other members are Dan Quinlivan and Rob Frye.

Their first album, Tones & Zones, was released in 2010.

They have recorded albums and performed live in collaboration with artists including Natural Information Society, Bonnie Prince Billy, and Olivia Wyatt.

Their music has been featured on a number of BBC radio programmes.

Discography

Albums 

 Tones & Zones (2010)
 Water Wrackets (2011)
 Vibraquatic (2012)
 Bitchitronics (2013)
 Bitchin Bajas (2014)
 Automaginary with Natural Information Society (2015)
 Epic Jammers and Fortunate Little Ditties with Bonnie Prince Billy (2016)
 Sailing a Sinking Sea with Bitchin Bajas (2016)
 Bajas Fresh (2017)
 Switched On Ra (2021)
 Bajascillators (2022)

EPs 

 Krausened (2013)
 Transporteur (2015)
 Demeter (2019)

Singles 

 "Bitchin Bajas" / "Moon Duo" (2010)

References

External links 

 
 
 

Musical groups established in 2010
American musical groups
2010 establishments in the United States